Hans Bauer (28 July 1927 – 31 October 1997) was a German footballer. Most of his career was spent with Bayern Munich, where he played as a defender and won the DFB-Pokal in 1957.

Alert and with fast reactions, the position of the left-footed Bauer was mostly that of a left full back. He played five times in the Germany national team between 1951 and 1958. The highlight of his career was being included in the squad for the 1954 World Cup.

References

External links 
 Portrait of Hans Bauer in 11 Freunde magazine 

1927 births
1997 deaths
German footballers
Germany international footballers
1954 FIFA World Cup players
FIFA World Cup-winning players
FC Bayern Munich footballers
Association football defenders
Footballers from Munich